Nematinus is a genus of sawflies belonging to the family Tenthredinidae.

The species of this genus are found in Europe, Easternmost Asia and Northern America.

Species:
 Nematinus acuminatus (Thomson, 1871)
 Nematinus bilineatus (Klug, 1819)

References

Tenthredinidae
Sawfly genera